"I'm Still" is a song performed by American contemporary R&B group LeVert. The song is the opening track from the group's debut album I Get Hot and was issued as the album's first single. The song was produced by lead singer Gerald Levert, and it peaked at #70 on the Billboard R&B chart in 1985.

Chart positions

References

1985 debut singles
LeVert songs
Song recordings produced by Gerald Levert
1985 songs
Songs written by Gerald Levert